Lluvia Rojo Moro (born 6 November 1976 in Madrid) is a Spanish actress and singer.

She studied translation and interpretation (English and German) in Madrid, New York City and Berlin. She also studied drama at the Jorge Eínes' Atelier. She is also a member of the hard-pop band No Band For Lluvia (Subterfuge Records), along with Kevin Kajetzke, Darío Lofish, and Lyndon Parish .

Filmography
 Íntimos y extraños, (2008), by Rubén Alonso
 Crónicas de la Vieja República (fanfilm)
 El síndrome de Svensson (2006), by Kepa Sojo
 Pobre juventud (2006), by Miguel Jiménez
 El Calentito (2005), by Chus Gutiérrez
 Alianza mortal (2002), by Rico brothers
 Barrio (1998), by Fernando León de Aranoa

Short films 
 Paco, (2009), by Jorge Roelas
 The Old Man in the Sea (2006), by Enrique Rodríguez. University of Navarre
 Ricardo, piezas descatalogadas  (2005), by Rico brothers
 Las superamigas contra el profesor Vinilo (2003), by Domingo González

Television

As a conductor
Los 40 principales (1997–1998)
+ Música (Canal satélite digital) (1997–1998)

As an actress
Cuéntame cómo pasó (2000–2011)
Paraíso (2000)
Hospital Central (1998)
Ellas son así (1998)
A las once en casa (1998)

Theatre
 Don Juan, el burlador de Sevilla (2008–2009), by Tirso de Molina
Aquí no paga nadie, by Darío Fo (2004–2005).

Radiotheatre 
 Psicosis (2010)

Awards 
 Ercilla de Teatro Award, 2008. Best New Actress for Don Juan, el burlador de Sevilla.
 Fundación Lumière: Premio "solidario a las artes escénicas" 2006
 Unión de Actores 2007 and 2004 nominations for best actress in a supporting role.

References

External links
 
 Cinemanía
 www.lluviarojo.es

1976 births
Living people
Actresses from Madrid
21st-century Spanish singers
21st-century Spanish women singers